The Canisius Golden Griffins women's basketball team is the women's basketball team that represents Canisius College in Buffalo, New York. The team currently competes in the Metro Atlantic Athletic Conference.

History
Canisius began play in 1975. They made one NCAA Division II Tournament in their time in the secondary division, making it to the Elite Eight in 1983. They played in the Upstate New York Conference from 1982 to 1986 and the Middle Eastern College Association for the 1986-87 season. They joined the MAAC in 1989. They made the WNIT in 2009.

Postseason appearances

NCAA Division I appearances
The Golden Griffins have made one NCAA Division I Tournament appearance. They have a record of 0-1.

NCAA Division II appearances
The Golden Griffins made one NCAA Division II Tournament appearance. They have a record of 1-1.

WNIT appearances

References

External links